Mary Queen of Heaven Roman Catholic Church is a historic church at N. First and B Street in Sprague, Washington.

It was built in a Gothic Revival style and was added to the National Register in 1990.

References

Roman Catholic Diocese of Spokane
Roman Catholic churches in Washington (state)
Churches on the National Register of Historic Places in Washington (state)
Gothic Revival church buildings in Washington (state)
Buildings and structures in Lincoln County, Washington
National Register of Historic Places in Lincoln County, Washington